Rosenborg may refer to:

Places

Denmark
 Rosenborg Castle, a castle in Copenhagen, Denmark

Norway
 Rosenborg, Trondheim, an area in the city of Trondheim, Norway
 Rosenborg (station) of the Oslo Tramway
 Rosenborg (old station) of the Oslo Tramway

Sports
 Rosenborg BK, an association football club based in the city of Trondheim, Norway
 Rosenborg IHK, an ice hockey club based in the city of Trondheim, Norway

Other
 Rosenborg (cheese), a variety of the Castello brand produced by Arla Foods

See also
 Rosenberg (disambiguation)